"The Ohio Company" is a song written by Pittsburgh composer Robert Schmertz about the Ohio Company. It was arranged by Frank C. Jarema.

Lyrics

References

American folk songs